Vassilakis is a Greek surname. Notable people with the surname include:

Adamantios Vassilakis (born 1942), Greek diplomat
Christian Vassilakis (born 2001), Spanish footballer
Panayiotis Vassilakis (1925–2019), also known as Takis, Greek artist

See also
, a Greek cargo ship

Greek-language surnames